Spilosoma extrema is a moth in the family Erebidae. It was described by Franz Daniel in 1943. It is found in Yunnan, China.

Note: Lepindex lists a Spilosoma extrema Bannerman, 1933 as a synonym of Spilosoma purpurata.

References

Moths described in 1943
extrema